Murkim is a Papuan language of Western New Guinea, near its relatives Lepki and Kembra. Though spoken by fewer than 300 people, it is being learned by children. It is spoken in Murkim District, Pegunungan Bintang Regency, Papua Province, Indonesia.

Dialects include the varieties spoken in Milki and Mot villages (Wambaliau 2004: 22-28).

Pronouns
Pronouns are:

{| 
|+ Murkim independent pronouns
!  !! sg !! pl
|-
! 1excl
| nuːk || nakme
|-
! 1incl
|  || nakmere
|-
! 2
| hak(o) || sakmere
|-
! 3
| colspan="2" style="text-align: center;" | kne ~ yak ~ ire
|}

Sentences
Example sentences in Murkim:

References

Wambaliau, Theresia. 2004. Survey Report on the Murkim Language in Papua, Indonesia. (in Indonesian). Unpublished manuscript. Jayapura: SIL Indonesia.

Languages of western New Guinea
Lepki–Murkim languages